Costa Rica competed at the 2022 World Aquatics Championships in Budapest, Hungary from 18 June to 3 July.

Artistic swimming 

Costa Rica entered 10 artistic swimmers.

Women

Open water swimming

Costa Rica entered 2 open water swimmers (1 men and 1 women)

Men

Women

Swimming

Costa Rica  entered 2 swimmers.
Men

Women

References

Nations at the 2022 World Aquatics Championships
2022
World Aquatics Championships